Ildar Badrutdinov (born 12 January 2000) is a Kazakhstani freestyle skier. He competed in the 2018 Winter Olympics.

References

2000 births
Living people
Freestyle skiers at the 2018 Winter Olympics
Kazakhstani male freestyle skiers
Olympic freestyle skiers of Kazakhstan